Joseph Cliff Gerber (born May 3, 1997) is an American professional baseball pitcher in the New York Yankees organization. He previously played in Major League Baseball (MLB) for the Seattle Mariners.

Amateur career
Gerber graduated from Wayzata High School in Plymouth, Minnesota in 2015. He went undrafted in the 2015 Major League Baseball draft out of high school and enrolled at the University of Illinois where he played college baseball for the Fighting Illini.

As a freshman at Illinois in 2016, Gerber pitched only six innings, compiling a 7.50 ERA. In 2017, his sophomore season, he went 2–1 with a 4.36 ERA in 33 relief innings pitched, striking out 43. In 2018, as a junior, he went 1–1 with a 3.14 ERA in  relief innings along with compiling 14 saves, tying the Illinois single-season record, earning a spot on the All-Big Ten Third Team. After his junior year, Gerber was selected by the Seattle Mariners in the eighth round of the 2018 Major League Baseball draft.

Professional career

Seattle Mariners
Gerber signed with Seattle and made his professional debut with the Everett AquaSox of the Class A Short Season Northwest League before being promoted to the Clinton LumberKings of the Class A Midwest League in July. In  relief innings between the two clubs, he went 1–0 with a 2.10 ERA and 43 strikeouts. Gerber began the 2019 season with the Modesto Nuts of the Class A-Advanced California League, earning All-Star honors. He was promoted to the Arkansas Travelers of the Class AA Texas League in June, and finished the season there. Over  relief innings pitched between the two clubs, Gerber went 1–4 with a 2.59 ERA, striking out 69 and compiling a .215 batting average against.

On August 4, 2020, Gerber made his MLB debut against the Los Angeles Angels, pitching one scoreless inning. He ended the 2020 season with a 1–1 record and a 4.02 ERA, striking out six batters over  innings. Gerber began the 2021 season on the injured list and underwent back surgery in July, forcing him to miss the whole year. He missed the beginning of the 2022 season due to the injury and was ultimately designated for assignment on June 18, 2022. He was released on June 22.

New York Yankees
Gerber signed with the New York Yankees on July 25, 2022. On August 3, he was assigned to the Florida Complex League Yankees, the Yankees minor league rookie level affiliate.

References

External links

1997 births
Living people
Arizona Complex League Mariners players
Arkansas Travelers players
Baseball players from Minnesota
Clinton LumberKings players
Everett AquaSox players
Illinois Fighting Illini baseball players
Major League Baseball pitchers
Modesto Nuts players
People from Maple Grove, Minnesota
Seattle Mariners players
Mankato MoonDogs players